The following are a list of massacres that have occurred in Malaysia and its predecessors:

Malaysia
Massacres

Massacres